St. Mary's High School was a private, Roman Catholic high school in Perth Amboy, in Middlesex County, New Jersey, United States.

The school closed in 1981 in the wake of declining enrollment.

Notable alumni
 Thomas J. Deverin (1921-2010), politician who served 11 terms in the New Jersey General Assembly, from 1970 to 1992
 Matt Loughlin, sportscaster who is the radio play-by-play voice of the New Jersey Devils of the National Hockey League on WFAN.
 Chris Smith (born 1953), politician currently serving in his 20th term as the U.S. representative for New Jersey's 4th congressional district, having served since 1981
 Ruth White (1914-1969), actress who worked in theatre, film, and television

References

1981 disestablishments in New Jersey
Educational institutions disestablished in 1981
Private high schools in Middlesex County, New Jersey
Catholic secondary schools in New Jersey
Perth Amboy, New Jersey